Kalateh-ye Hajji (also Romanized as Kalāteh-ye Ḩājjī) is a village in Barzanun Rural District, Sarvelayat District, Nishapur County, Razavi Khorasan Province, Iran. At the 2006 census, its population was 144, in 28 families.

References 

Populated places in Nishapur County